The 2016 Virginia Tech Hokies men's soccer team represented Virginia Tech during the 2016 NCAA Division I men's soccer season. It was the 45th season of the university fielding a program. The Hokies played their home fixtures at Sandra D. Thompson Field in Blacksburg, Virginia.

The 2016 season proved to be one of the program's most successful seasons. The Hokies were ranked for the first time since 2008, and earned their first NCAA Tournament berth since 2007. In the NCAA Tournament, the Hokies reached the quarterfinals before losing to fellow ACC outfit, Wake Forest.

Schedule 

|-
!colspan=6 style="background:#660000; color:#CC5500;"| Preseason
|-

|-
!colspan=6 style="background:#660000; color:#CC5500;"| Regular season
|-

|-
!colspan=6 style="background:#660000; color:#CC5500;"| ACC Tournament
|-

|-
!colspan=6 style="background:#660000; color:#CC5500;"| NCAA Tournament
|-

|}

See also 

 Virginia Tech Hokies men's soccer
 2016 Atlantic Coast Conference men's soccer season
 2016 NCAA Division I men's soccer season
 2016 ACC Men's Soccer Tournament
 2016 NCAA Division I Men's Soccer Championship

References 

Virginia Tech Hokies
Virginia Tech Hokies men's soccer seasons
Virginia Tech Hokies, Soccer
Virginia Tech Hokies
Virginia Tech Hokies